Martul is one of four parroquias, a parish (administrative division) in Villanueva de Oscos, a municipality within the province and autonomous community of Asturias, in northern Spain.

Villages and hamlets
 Cimadevila
 Martul
 Salcedo
 Sanamede
 Trabadelo

Notable attractions
 Capilla (chapel) de Cimadevilla
 Iglesia (church) de San Juan El Degollado in Martul 

Parishes in Villanueva de Oscos